The year 1868 in science and technology involved some significant events, listed below.

Biology
 January 30 – Publication of Charles Darwin's The Variation of Animals and Plants Under Domestication (by John Murray in London), including his theory of heredity, which he calls pangenesis.
 Jules-Emile Planchon and colleagues propose Phylloxera as the cause of the Great French Wine Blight.
 Roland Trimen reads a paper to the Linnaean Society explaining Batesian mimicry in African butterflies.
 T. H. Huxley discovers what he thinks is primordial matter and names it Bathybius haeckelii. He admits his mistake in 1871.
 The Granny Smith apple cultivar originates in Eastwood, New South Wales, Australia, from a chance seedling propagated by Maria Ann Smith (née Sherwood, 1799–1870).

Chemistry
 August 18 – The element later named as helium is first detected in the spectrum of the Sun's chromosphere by French astronomer Jules Janssen during a total eclipse in Guntur, India, but assumed to be sodium.
 October 20 – English astronomer Norman Lockyer observes and names the D3 Fraunhofer line in the solar spectrum and concludes that it is caused by a hitherto unidentified element which he later names helium.
 Louis Arthur Ducos du Hauron patents methods of color photography.

Medicine
 Jean-Martin Charcot describes and names multiple sclerosis.
 Adolph Kussmaul performs the first esophagogastroduodenoscopy on a living human.

Paleontology
 March – French geologist Louis Lartet discovers the first identified skeletons of Cro-Magnon, the first anatomically modern humans (early Homo sapiens sapiens), at Abri de Crô-Magnon, a rock shelter at Les Eyzies, Dordogne, France.

Technology
 October 28 – American inventor Thomas Edison applies for his first patent, for a form of electronic voting machine.
 Ernest and Auguste Bollée first patent the Éolienne Bollée wind turbine in France.
 Pendulum-and-hydrostat control for the Whitehead torpedo developed by Robert Whitehead.

Awards
 Copley Medal: Charles Wheatstone
 Wollaston Medal for Geology: Carl Friedrich Naumann

Births
 January 9 – S. P. L. Sørensen (died 1939), Danish chemist.
 January 31 – Theodore William Richards (died 1928), American chemist, recipient of Nobel Prize in Chemistry.
 February 7 – Aleen Cust (died 1937), Anglo-Irish veterinary surgeon.
 March 15 – Grace Chisholm Young (died 1944), English mathematician.
 March 22 – Robert Andrews Millikan (died 1953), American physicist, recipient of Nobel Prize in Physics.<ref</ref>
 April 4 
 Philippa Fawcett (died 1948), English mathematician.
 Henrietta Swan Leavitt (died 1921), American astronomer
 April 5 – Percy Furnivall (died 1938), English surgeon.
 April 8 – Herbert Spencer Jennings (died 1947), American zoologist.
 April 14 – Annie S. D. Maunder, née Russell (died 1947), Irish astronomer.
 April 28 – Georgy Voronoy (died 1908), Ukrainian mathematician.
 April 30 – J. B. Christopherson (died 1955), English physician.
 May 2 – Robert W. Wood (died 1955), American optical physicist.
 June 6 – Robert Falcon Scott (died 1912), English explorer.
 June 7 – John Sealy Townsend (died 1957), Irish mathematical physicist.
 June 14 – Karl Landsteiner (died 1943), Austrian physiologist.
 July 4 – Henrietta Swan Leavitt (died 1921), American astronomer.
 October 23 – Frederick W. Lanchester (died 1946), English automotive engineer.
 November 8 – Felix Hausdorff (died 1942), German mathematician.
 November 14 – Karl Landsteiner (died 1943), Austrian-born physiologist, recipient of Nobel Prize in Physiology or Medicine.
 November 15 – Emil Racoviță (died 1947), Romanian biologist, speleologist and explorer.
 November 17 – Korbinian Brodmann (died 1918), German neurologist.
 December 5 – Arnold Sommerfeld (died 1951), German theoretical physicist.
 December 9 – Fritz Haber (died 1934), German chemist.

Deaths
 February 10 – Sir David Brewster, Scottish physicist (born 1781) 
 February 11 – Léon Foucault (born 1819), French physicist.
 February 24 – John Herapath (born 1790), English physicist.
 May 22 – Julius Plücker (born 1801), German mathematician and physicist.
 June 25 – Alexander Mitchell (born 1780), Irish engineer and inventor of the screw-pile lighthouse.
 June 29 – Sir John Lillie, British army officer, entrepreneur and inventor (born 1790)
 July 15 – William T. G. Morton (born 1819), American dentist.
 August 29 – Christian Friedrich Schönbein, German chemist and inventor of the fuel cell (born 1799)
 September 26 – August Ferdinand Möbius (born 1790), German mathematician and astronomer
 December 25 – Linus Yale, Jr. (born 1821), American engineer and inventor.
 December 31 – James David Forbes (born 1809), Scottish-born physicist, glaciologist and seismologist.

References

 
Science, 1868 In
1860s in science
19th century in science